Kolobeng Mission (also known as the Livingstone Memorial), built in 1847, the third and final mission of David Livingstone, a missionary and explorer of Africa. While here, Livingstone converted Sechele I, kgosi of the Bakwena and taught them irrigation methods using the nearby Kolobeng River. A drought began in 1848, and the Bakwena blamed the natural disaster on Livingstone's presence. In 1852, Boer farmers attacked the tribes in the area, including the Bakwena at Kolobeng in the Battle of Dimawe. This prompted the Livingstones to leave Kolobeng, and the mission was abandoned. A fence was installed around the site in 1935, and the mission is now preserved by the Department of National Museum and Monuments under Botswana's Ministry of Environment, Wildlife and Tourism.

History
Before David Livingstone arrived in Kolobeng, he was first assigned to a London Missionary Society mission in Kuruman in present-day South Africa in 1841. He met Sechele I, leader of the Bakwena, while stationed in Kuruman. He later moved to Chonuane with the Bakwena and stayed there for a year. A drought occurred, and Livingstone convinced Sechele that rainmaking would not end the drought, and that the only way to water their crops was to "select some good, never-failing river, make a canal, and irrigate the adjacent lands".

At their new location, the Bakwena built a dam and canal from the river as well as a school while Livingstone built Sechele's house, taught the clan how to irrigate fields, and practised Western medicine. Livingstone stated that their attempt at living at Kolobeng "succeeded admirably". However, after the first year, a drought caused the river to run dry. Livingstone's fourth child, Elizabeth, died two months after being born during the drought and was buried at Kolobeng. During the drought, the Bakwena, seeing that other tribes in the area were receiving rain, asked Livingstone to produce rain, but, while he sympathized, he tried to stop their rainmaking rituals and requested that they focus more on praying to God. Sechele's uncle had this to say about Livingstone and his response: 

In 1852, the Battle of Dimawe occurred. Boer farmers raided the settlement, stealing cattle, wagons, and women, but through the command of Sechele, the Bakwena successfully defended their settlement. The raid and the ongoing drought caused unrest among the Bakwena so they left the settlement. Livingstone also left the mission for Cape Town to restock for his future travels further inland while his wife and children returned to England.

Present-day
The site sat unattended until 1935 when a doctor from the Scottish Livingstone Hospital in Molepolole built a fence around the mission. Today, only the remnants of the irrigation system and the foundations of the buildings remain.

Legacy
In honour of the 200th anniversary of David Livingstone's birth, a play, I Knew A Man Called Livingstone, was created. The play is told through the eyes of the African people whom he met during his travels, and part of the play focuses on his time spent at Kolobeng.

See also
Sites and monuments in Botswana

References

External links
Official government page on Kolobeng
Other historical sites in Botswana
Official page of I Knew A Man Called Livingstone
Kolobeng Find a Grave page for the Livingstone cemetery at Kolobeng.
Elizabeth Pyne Livingstone grave site Find a Grave memorial page for infant Elizabeth, which includes a photograph of the grave site.

Christian missions in Africa
Defunct Christian schools
Monuments and memorials in Botswana
1847 establishments in Africa
Religious buildings and structures completed in 1847
Archaeological sites in Botswana
Christian schools in Botswana
Churches in Botswana